Daingerfield-Lone Star Independent School District is a public school district based in Daingerfield, Texas (USA).

Located in Morris County, a small portion of the district extends into Titus County.

This small district obtains its name from the two towns which, at one time, held at least one school. Lone Star Elementary was a small and unnecessary edition to the remaining four schools that now make up the entire district. The building in Lone Star was shut down in 2010, forcing all of the kids to attend either West or South Elementary.

In 2009, the school district was rated "academically acceptable" by the Texas Education Agency.

Notable Events 
In September 2010, during a meeting of the district's board of trustees, district Superintendent E.W. "Pat" Adams announced his intention to resign his post at the end of the 2010-2011 academic year. A local news source reported that Adams, "...used the occasion to voice his opinion on the board and how it operates." Reportedly, Adams stated during this meeting that he, "...[has] memories of a great board that had no personal agendas, but cared about [the district's] students first and foremost. Some on the present board have personal agendas, because not one word has been said about our students. It has been all about changing policy that affects our administrators and teachers, questioning our duties and above all, micromanaging."

Schools
The district has four schools, all located in Daingerfield:
Daingerfield High School (Daingerfield; Grades 9-12)
Daingerfield Junior High (Daingerfield; Grades 6-8)
South Elementary (Daingerfield; Grades 3-5)
West Elementary (Daingerfield; Grades PK-2)

The district formerly operated Lone Star Elementary (Grades PK-5) in Lone Star; however, due to declining enrollment the school was closed.

References

External links
Daingerfield-Lone Star ISD

School districts in Morris County, Texas
School districts in Titus County, Texas